The 1928 AAA Championship Car season consisted of seven races, beginning in Speedway, Indiana on May 30 and concluding in Salem, New Hampshire on October 12.  There were also three non-championship races.  The AAA National Champion and Indianapolis 500 winner was Louis Meyer.

Schedule and results
All races running on Dirt/Brick/Board Oval.

 Scheduled for 200 miles, stopped due to track breaking up.

Leading National Championship standings

References

See also
 1928 Indianapolis 500

AAA Championship Car season
AAA Championship Car
1928 in American motorsport